Koro Tainui Wētere  (22 June 1935 – 23 June 2018) was a New Zealand politician. He was an MP from 1969 to 1996, representing the Labour Party. He served as Minister of Māori Affairs in the Fourth Labour Government (1984–1990).

Early life and family
Born at Oparure, near Te Kūiti, on 22 June 1935, Wētere was the son of Weo Maruatara Wētere and Te Aorangi Wētere (née Eketone), and affiliated to the Ngāti Maniapoto iwi. He was educated at Te Kūiti High School and Massey University, and was ordained a minister (āpotoro rēhita or registered apostle) of the Rātana Church, serving as parish minister for Oparure, Te Kūiti and Piopio in the 1960s.

In 1960, Wētere married Nedracita Takuora Edwards, and the couple went on to have five children.

Member of Parliament

Wētere joined the Labour Party in 1957, and was first elected to Parliament in the 1969 election as MP for the Western Maori electorate, one of the four Māori electorates in New Zealand's House of Representatives. Given Labour's traditional dominance in the Māori electorates, Wētere held his position without difficulty until his retirement at the 1996 election. In 1976 he was promoted by Labour leader Bill Rowling and made Shadow Minister of Forests. Three years later he was given the Maori Affairs and Lands portfolios instead.

Cabinet minister
Wētere became Minister of Māori Affairs when the Labour Party won the 1984 election, serving in that role until 1990. He also served as Minister of Lands, Minister of Forestry, and the Minister in charge of the Valuation Department between 1984 and 1987, and the Minister in charge of the Iwi Transition Agency between 1989 and 1990.

Wētere was criticised during the Māori loan affair of 1985–86, and was nearly asked to resign. Tamati Reedy, the head of Wētere's department, Te Puni Kokiri, attempted to arrange an unauthorised overseas loan for Māori businesses. Wētere was the subject of strong attacks over the issue by National Party MP Winston Peters, but denied any wrongdoing. In 1990 Wētere refused to translate his addresses to parliament into English, having given them in Māori. This was one of a number of steps which pushed the issue of the use of Māori in public life during this time. There are now arrangements for simultaneous interpretation between English and Māori in Parliament.

When Labour lost power in the 1990 election, Wētere returned to opposition for two terms before retiring from politics. He was Shadow Minister of Maori Affairs from 1990 to 1996 under Mike Moore and later Helen Clark. Never a supporter of Clark, Wētere was one of several frontbenchers who was part of a delegation met with Clark in her office prior to a caucus meeting in 1996 persuading her to stand down and informing her (in a ruse) that they had the numbers to oust her as leader (in favour of Phil Goff) if she refused. Clark stared Goff and his supporters down and ultimately remained leader.

Honours
Wētere was awarded the Queen Elizabeth II Silver Jubilee Medal in 1977, and the New Zealand 1990 Commemoration Medal. In the 1996 New Year Honours, he was appointed a Commander of the Order of the British Empire, for services to the Māori people.

The University of Waikato awarded Wētere an honorary doctorate for his contributions to the well-being and the advancement of Māori affairs in Aotearoa in 1999, and a lifetime achievement award, Te Tohu Whakamaharatanga ki Te Arikinui Te Atairangikaahu, in 2008.

Death
Wētere died in Te Kūiti on 23 June 2018, one day after his 83rd birthday.

References

1935 births
2018 deaths
New Zealand MPs for Māori electorates
Members of the Cabinet of New Zealand
New Zealand Labour Party MPs
Ngāti Maniapoto people
New Zealand Commanders of the Order of the British Empire
Members of the New Zealand House of Representatives
People educated at Te Kuiti High School
Massey University alumni